Garendon High School was a middle school located in Thorpe Acre, Loughborough, Leicestershire, England.

It contained three years (7, 8 and 9). Altogether, there were 558 pupils in the 2008–2009 school year.

The school closed over Summer 2012.

History
Garendon High School, which opened in 1954, was a middle school for around 560 students aged 11 to 15.

The school was recognized in its 2007 Ofsted inspection as "A good school with many outstanding features".

As of September 2012, Burleigh Community College and Garendon High School merged to become Charnwood College, a through school from ages 11 to 19.

Awards
In September 2008, the school was awarded the status of Specialist Sports College.

It was designated as a "Lead School" by the local authority and achieved International School Status and Healthy Schools Accreditation. The school also achieved the prestigious Artsmark Gold standard.

References

Defunct schools in Leicestershire
Educational institutions established in 1954
Educational institutions disestablished in 2012
1954 establishments in England
2012 disestablishments in England